David J.B. Trim is a historian, archivist, and educator whose specialties are in European military history and  religious history. Currently, he is the director of Archives, Statistics, and Research at the World Headquarters of Seventh-day Adventists.

Background
Trim was born in Bombay, India, in 1969 to British and Australian parents and raised largely in Sydney, Australia. He was educated in Britain: he graduated cum laude from Newbold College with a BA in History; his PhD in War Studies and History is from King's College, London, part of the University of London.

Career
Trim taught for ten years at Newbold College and for two years held the Walter C. Utt Chair in History at Pacific Union College. In late 2010 he was appointed Archivist of the Seventh-day Adventist Church and in 2011 became its global Director of Research. He has held research fellowships at the Huntington Library and the Folger Shakespeare Library, and been a visiting scholar at the University of California at Berkeley and the University of Reading in the United Kingdom. Trim has been a Fellow of the Royal Historical Society since 2003.

Scholarship
Trim is the editor or co-editor of thirteen volumes, including: The Chivalric Ethos and the Development of Military Professionalism (Brill, 2003), Amphibious Warfare 1000-1700: Commerce, State Formation and European Expansion (Brill, 2006), European Warfare 1350-1750 (Cambridge University Press, 2010), Pluralism, Parochialism and Contextualization: Challenges to Adventist Mission in Europe 1864-2004 (Peter Lang, 2010), and Humanitarian Intervention: A History (Cambridge University Press, 2011). Humanitarian Intervention: A History was widely reviewed not only in academic journals but in mainstream press, including in India.

Bibliography
 A Passion for Mission: The Trans-European Division after Ninety Years. Newbold Academic Press, 2019.
 A Living Sacrifice: Unsung Heroes of Adventist Missions. Pacific Press, 2019.
Co-editor, with Yvonne M. Terry-McElrath, Curis J. VanderWaal, and Alina J. Baltazar, Promoting the public good: Policy in the public square and the Church. Cooranbong, NSW, Australia: Avondale Academic Press, 2018. 
Co-editor, with Benjamin J. Baker, Fundamental Belief 6: Creation. Silver Spring, MD: Office of Archives, Statistics, and Research, 2014.
Editor, The Huguenots: History and Memory in Transnational Context. Leiden & Boston: Brill, 2011. 
Co-editor, with Brendan Simms, Humanitarian Intervention—A History. Cambridge: Cambridge University Press, 2011; South Asian edn, 2011; paperback edn, 2013. 
Co-editor, with Frank Tallett, European Warfare, 1350–1750. Cambridge: Cambridge University Press, 2010. 
Co-editor, with Daniel Heinz, Pluralism, Parochialism and Contextualization: Challenges to Adventist Mission in Europe. Oxford, Bern, Berlin, Brussels, Frankfurt am Main, New York & Vienna: Peter Lang, 2010.
Co-editor, with Richard Bonney, The Development of Pluralism in Modern Britain and France. Oxford, Bern, Berlin, Brussels, Frankfurt am Main, New York & Vienna: Peter Lang, 2007. 
Co-editor, with Richard Bonney, Persecution and Pluralism: Calvinists and Religious Minorities in Early-Modern Europe, 1550-1700.  Oxford, Bern, Berlin, Brussels, Frankfurt am Main, New York & Vienna: Peter Lang, 2006.
Co-editor, with Mark Charles Fissel, Amphibious Warfare 1000-1700: Commerce, State Formation and European Expansion. Leiden & Boston: Brill, 2006; paperback edn, 2011. 
Co-editor, with Peter J. Balderstone, Cross, Crown and Community: Religion, Government and Culture in Early Modern England, 1400–1800. Oxford, Bern & New York: Peter Lang, 2004.
Editor, The Chivalric Ethos and the Development of Military Professionalism. Leiden & Boston: Brill, 2003.

Editorships
Founder and co-editor, monograph series "Warfare, Society and Culture," Routledge (originally Pickering & Chatto), August 2007–present. 
Associate editor, Journal of the Society for Army Historical Research (founded 1921) Jan. 2002–2010. 
Consultant associate editor, Oxford Dictionary of National Biography (2004), for "Tudor army."

References

External links
 Office of Archives, Statistics, and Research
 General Conference of Seventh-day Adventist Church
 King's College
 University of London 
 Brill
 Cambridge University Press

Pacific Union College faculty
Australian Seventh-day Adventists
Alumni of King's College London
Historians of Christianity
Writers from Sydney
Australian historians of religion
1969 births
Living people